1X or 1-X may refer to:

 1X Band, a musical group from Slovenia
 1. X. 1905, a piano composition by Leoš Janáček
 Saab 9-1X
 Alberta Highway 1X; see Alberta Highway 1A
 NY 1X; see Hutchinson River Parkway
 SSH 1X (WA); see List of former state highways in Washington
 CDMA2000 1x; see CDMA2000
 1/x; see Multiplicative inverse
 1x-EVDO; see Evolution-Data Optimized
 Ares 1-X; see Ares I-X
 Will 1x, early stage name for will.i.am
 1x CD-ROM; see CD-ROM
 EH-1X; see Bell UH-1 Iroquois variants
 GSC-1X; see GSC bus
 Xbox One X
 HTC One X smartphone
 One-X (2006 album) album by Three Days Grace
 Single scull in rowing

See also
 X1 (disambiguation)
 Onex (disambiguation)